Andrea Rossi (born 7 November 1986) is an Italian footballer who plays as a defender.

Career
He is one of the member of Juventus's under-20 team to win 2006 Primavera League.

Siena
He was on loan to Siena in summer 2006, and made his debut on 17 December 2006 against Atalanta B.C. At the end of season, half of the registration rights of Rossi was sold for €400,000 fee Siena signed him outright for another €1 million fee in June 2008.

Parma
In June 2012, he moved to Parma in a 5-year deal after making 61 league appearances in his six years at Siena. The deal was a mega cashless player swap (in another co-ownership deals), which saw Rossi, Iacobucci, Pacini and Brandão moved to Parma and Coppola, Doumbia, Galuppo and Dellafiore moved to Siena. He was one of the 32 players for the pre-season camp of Parma. However, along with Brandão they left for Cesena, which Parma had signed Marco Parolo and Yohan Benalouane on temporary deals from Cesena on 7 July and on 20 August for €1 million and for free. Parma also subsidized Cesena for €3 million as premi di valorizzazione for Rossi and Brandão. In January 2013 he was signed by Bari. In July 2013 Rossi left for Pescara. In June 2014 the co-ownership deal of Rossi was renewed. Nevertheless, Parma acquired Rossi outright in July after the bankruptcy of Siena.

On 8 July 2014 he was signed by Latina on a temporary deal. Rossi left Parma in January 2015, after the club faced a financial difficulty that eventually bankrupted in June 2015.

Pescara 
In January 2015 Rossi returned to Pescara again for an undisclosed fee. On 10 July Rossi signed a new 3-year contract.

On 29 August 2015 he was signed by Salernitana on a 2-year loan, with an option to sign outright.

On 29 August 2016 Rossi was signed by Brescia on a temporary deal from Pescara. On 31 January 2017 he left for Ternana on loan.
On 31 January 2018, he left Pescara as a free agent.

Teramo 
On 2 February 2018, Teramo announced the signing of Andrea Rossi on a six-month contract.

References

External links
 
 

1986 births
Living people
People from San Benedetto del Tronto
Italian footballers
Juventus F.C. players
A.C.N. Siena 1904 players
Parma Calcio 1913 players
A.C. Cesena players
Delfino Pescara 1936 players
Latina Calcio 1932 players
U.S. Salernitana 1919 players
Serie A players
Serie B players
Association football defenders
Sportspeople from the Province of Ascoli Piceno
Footballers from Marche